Carex flexuosa, commonly called flexuous white-edge sedge, or Rudge's white-edge sedge, is a species of flowering plant in the sedge family, Cyperaceae. It is native to the eastern North America, where it is found in eastern Canada, the northeastern and midwestern United States, and southward in the Appalachian Mountains. Its natural habitat is in upland forests, rock outcrops, and Appalachian balds. It is typically found in areas with acidic soil.

Carex flexuosa is a clumping perennial. It is similar to Carex debilis, of which it is frequently considered a variety, as Carex debilis var. rudgei. Carex flexuosa can be distinguished from C. debilis by its smaller perigynia that are broadest near the middle. It is also similar to Carex allegheniensis, from which Carex flexuosa can be distinguished by its glabrous (hairless) perigynia.

References

flexuosa
Flora of North America
Plants described in 1805
Taxa named by Gotthilf Heinrich Ernst Muhlenberg